Gymnopilus perplexus is a species of mushroom in the family Hymenogastraceae.

See also

 List of Gymnopilus species

External links
Gymnopilus perplexus at Index Fungorum

perplexus
Fungi of North America